Myint & Associates is a major service provider for oil and gas companies that operate in Myanmar (Burma), providing supply and logistical services. It was the first private company in the country to operate and provide these services. The company's clients include Total, Unocal, Halliburton and Petronas.

References

Oil and gas companies of Myanmar
Non-renewable resource companies established in 1989
1989 establishments in Myanmar
Companies based in Yangon